Books+Publishing (formerly Bookseller+Publisher and Australian Bookseller & Publisher) is a news outlet reporting on the Australian book industry. Published as a website with daily newsletters and a print magazine, the outlet produces industry news about publishing, bookselling, libraries, rights sales, literary awards and literary festivals, as well as author interviews and pre-publication reviews of Australian and New Zealand books.

History
Books+Publishing was founded as a magazine in 1921 by Daniel Wrixon Thorpe as the Australian Stationery and Fancy Goods Journal, at a time when there were few Australian retailers solely focused on the sale of books. The magazine has been continuously published ever since, changing its name to Ideas in the 1937. The name then change to Australian Bookseller & Publisher in 1971 when the D. W. Thorpe company was taken over by Thorpe's daughter, Joyce Nicholson.

In 1971, the company began publishing the Weekly Book Newsletter—an offshoot of the magazine—containing weekly book-industry news and became colloquially known as the Blue News, because of the blue paper it was printed on.

The D. W. Thorpe company was sold to Reed Reference Publishing in 1992, then sold to R. R. Bowker in 2001, and the company became Thorpe-Bowker in 2003. (R. R. Bowker is currently owned by ProQuest.)

The word 'Australian' was dropped from the magazine's title at the start of 2006 to become Bookseller+Publisher, partly in acknowledgement of Australia's growing role as a publishing and bookselling hub for the entire Asia-Pacific region. In 2006 the Weekly Book Newsletter became an online newsletter that is emailed to subscribers and available on the website.

The publication was renamed to Books+Publishing in 2012, and the newsletter Library News that Thorpe-Bowker had acquired in 2007 was folded into the renamed publication. Two offshoot newsletters carrying book reviews, the Reviews Newsletter and the Junior Newsletter, began in 2012, and one year later the first Daily Newsletter was sent out to subscribers containing news about the book industry on a daily basis, which is republished in the Weekly Book Newsletter. The Think Australian Newsletter and Think Australian Junior Newsletter were established in 2017, containing news about the sale of rights of Australian titles for an international audience.

In 2018, Thorpe-Bowker sold the entire Books+Publishing publication, including the magazine, newsletters and website, to Thorpe-Bowker General Manager Gary Pengelly, under the company Books and Publishing Pty Ltd. In 2020, the business decided to postpone publishing the magazine, Think Australian and its book-review newsletters due to COVID-19.

References

External links
 Books+Publishing website

1921 establishments in Australia
Business magazines published in Australia
Literary magazines published in Australia
News magazines published in Australia
Quarterly magazines published in Australia
Book review magazines
Literary criticism
Magazines established in 1921
Magazines published in Melbourne
Professional and trade magazines